Astapenka is a surname. Notable people with the surname include:
 Raman Astapenka (born 1980), Belarusian footballer
 Vladzimir Astapenka (born 1962), Belarusian diplomat